Bacchus and Ariadne is a 1523 painting by Titian.

Bacchus and Ariadne may also refer to:

Bacchus and Ariadne (ballet), a 1930 ballet by Albert Roussel
Bacchus and Ariadne (poem), an 1819 poem by Leigh Hunt
Bacchus and Ariadne (sculpture), a 1505-1510 sculpture by Tullio Lombardo

Dionysus in art